Human behavior is the potential and expressed capacity (mentally, physically, and socially) of human individuals or groups to respond to internal and external stimuli throughout their life. Behavior is driven by genetic and environmental factors that affect an individual. Behavior is also driven, in part, by thoughts and feelings, which provide insight into individual psyche, revealing such things as attitudes and values. Human behavior is shaped by psychological traits, as personality types vary from person to person, producing different actions and behavior.

Social behavior accounts for actions directed at others. It is concerned with the considerable influence of social interaction and culture, as well as ethics, interpersonal relationships, politics, and conflict. Some behaviors are common while others are unusual. The acceptability of behavior depends upon social norms and is regulated by various means of social control. Social norms also condition behavior, whereby humans are pressured into following certain rules and displaying certain behaviors that are deemed acceptable or unacceptable depending on the given society or culture.

Cognitive behavior accounts for actions of obtaining and using knowledge. It is concerned with how information is learned and passed on, as well as creative application of knowledge and personal beliefs such as religion. Physiological behavior accounts for actions to maintain the body. It is concerned with basic bodily functions as well as measures taken to maintain health. Economic behavior accounts for actions regarding the development, organization, and use of materials as well as other forms of work. Ecological behavior accounts for actions involving the ecosystem. It is concerned with how humans interact with other organisms and how the environment shapes human behavior.

Study 

Human behavior is studied by the social sciences, which include psychology, sociology, ethology, and their various branches and schools of thought. The study of human behavior includes how the human mind evolved and how the nervous system controls behavior. The nature versus nurture debate considers how behavior is affected by genetic and environmental factors. Philosophy of mind considers aspects such as free will, the mind–body problem, and malleability of human behavior. The study of human behavior sometimes receives public attention due to its intersection with cultural issues, including crime, sexuality, and social inequality.

Twin studies are a common method by which human behavior is studied. Twins with identical genomes can be compared to isolate genetic and environmental factors in behavior. Lifestyle, susceptibility to disease, and unhealthy behaviors have been identified to have both genetic and environmental indicators through twin studies.

Social behavior 

Human social behavior is the behavior that considers other humans, including communication and cooperation. It is highly complex and structured, based on advanced theory of mind that allows humans to attribute thoughts and actions to one another. Through social behavior, humans have developed society and culture distinct from other animals. Human social behavior is governed by a combination of biological factors that affect all humans and cultural factors that change depending on upbringing and societal norms. Human communication is based heavily on language, typically through speech or writing. Nonverbal communication and paralanguage can modify the meaning of communications by demonstrating ideas and intent through physical and vocal behaviors.

Social norms 
Human behavior in a society is governed by social norms. Social norms are unwritten expectations that members of society have for one another. These norms are ingrained in the particular culture that they emerge from, and humans often follow them unconsciously or without deliberation. These norms affect every aspect of life in human society, including decorum, social responsibility, property rights, contractual agreement, morality, justice, and meaning. Many norms facilitate coordination between members of society and prove mutually beneficial, such as norms regarding communication and agreements. Norms are enforced by social pressure, and individuals that violate social norms risk social exclusion.

Systems of ethics are used to guide human behavior to determine what is moral. Humans are distinct from other animals in the use of ethical systems to determine behavior. Ethical behavior is human behavior that takes into consideration how actions will affect others and whether behaviors will be optimal for others. What constitutes ethical behavior is determined by the individual value judgments of the person and the collective social norms regarding right and wrong. Value judgments are intrinsic to people of all cultures, though the specific systems used to evaluate them may vary. These systems may be derived from divine law, natural law, civil authority, reason, or a combination of these and other principles. Altruism is an associated behavior in which humans consider the welfare of others equally or preferentially to their own. While other animals engage in biological altruism, ethical altruism is unique to humans.

Deviance is behavior that violates social norms. As social norms vary between individuals and cultures, the nature and severity of a deviant act is subjective. What is considered deviant by a society may also change over time as new social norms are developed. Deviance is punished by other individuals through social stigma, censure, or violence. Many deviant actions are recognized as crimes and punished through a system of criminal justice. Deviant actions may be punished to prevent harm to others, to maintain a particular worldview and way of life, or to enforce principles of morality and decency. Cultures also attribute positive value to certain physical traits, causing individuals that do not have these traits to be seen as deviant.

Interpersonal relationships 

Interpersonal relationships can be evaluated by the specific choices and emotions between two individuals, or they can be evaluated by the broader societal context of how such a relationship is expected to function. Relationships are developed through communication, which creates intimacy, expresses emotions, and develops identity. An individual's interpersonal relationships form a social group in which individuals all communicate and socialize with one another, and these social groups are connected by additional relationships. Human social behavior is affected not only by individual relationships, but also by how behaviors in one relationship may affect others. Individuals that actively seek out social interactions are extraverts, and those that do not are introverts.

Romantic love is a significant interpersonal attraction toward another. Its nature varies by culture, but it is often contingent on gender, occurring in conjunction with sexual attraction and being either heterosexual or homosexual. It takes different forms and is associated with many individual emotions. Many cultures place a higher emphasis on romantic love than other forms of interpersonal attraction. Marriage is a union between two people, though whether it is associated with romantic love is dependent on the culture. Individuals that are closely related by consanguinity form a family. There are many variations on family structures that may include parents and children as well as stepchildren or extended relatives. Family units with children emphasize parenting, in which parents engage in a high level of parental investment to protect and instruct children as they develop over a period of time longer than that of most other mammals.

Politics and conflict 

When humans make decisions as a group, they engage in politics. Humans have evolved to engage in behaviors of self-interest, but this also includes behaviors that facilitate cooperation rather than conflict in collective settings. Individuals will often form in-group and out-group perceptions, through which individuals cooperate with the in-group and compete with the out-group. This causes behaviors such as unconsciously conforming, passively obeying authority, taking pleasure in the misfortune of opponents, initiating hostility toward out-group members, artificially creating out-groups when none exist, and punishing those that do not comply with the standards of the in-group. These behaviors lead to the creation of political systems that enforce in-group standards and norms.

When humans oppose one another, it creates conflict. It may occur when the involved parties have a disagreement of opinion, when one party obstructs the goals of another, or when parties experience negative emotions such as anger toward one another. Conflicts purely of disagreement are often resolved through communication or negotiation, but incorporation of emotional or obstructive aspects can escalate conflict. Interpersonal conflict is that between specific individuals or groups of individuals. Social conflict is that between different social groups or demographics. This form of conflict often takes place when groups in society are marginalized, do not have the resources they desire, wish to instigate social change, or wish to resist social change. Significant social conflict can cause civil disorder. International conflict is that between nations or governments. It may be solved through diplomacy or war.

Cognitive behavior 

Human cognition is distinct from that of other animals. This is derived from biological traits of human cognition, but also from shared knowledge and development passed down culturally. Humans are able to learn from one another due to advanced theory of mind that allows knowledge to be obtained through education. The use of language allows humans to directly pass knowledge to one another. The human brain has neuroplasticity, allowing it to modify its features in response to new experiences. This facilitates learning in humans and leads to behaviors of practice, allowing the development of new skills in individual humans. Behavior carried out over time can be ingrained as a habit, where humans will continue to regularly engage in the behavior without consciously decided to do so.

Humans engage in reason to make inferences with a limited amount of information. Most human reasoning is done automatically without conscious effort on the part of the individual. Reasoning is carried out by making generalizations from past experiences and applying them to new circumstances. Learned knowledge is acquired to make more accurate inferences about the subject. Deductive reasoning infers conclusions that are true based on logical premises, while inductive reasoning infers what conclusions are likely to be true based on context.

Emotion is a cognitive experience innate to humans. Basic emotions such as joy, distress, anger, fear, surprise, and disgust are common to all cultures, though social norms regarding the expression of emotion may vary. Other emotions come from higher cognition, such as love, guilt, shame, embarrassment, pride, envy, and jealousy. These emotions develop over time rather than instantly and are more strongly influenced by cultural factors. Emotions are influenced by sensory information, such as color and music, and moods of happiness and sadness. Humans typically maintain a standard level of happiness or sadness determined by health and social relationships, though positive and negative events have short-term influences on mood. Humans often seek to improve the moods of one another through consolation, entertainment, and venting. Humans can also self-regulate mood through exercise and meditation.

Creativity is the use of previous ideas or resources to produce something original. It allows for innovation, adaptation to change, learning new information, and novel problem solving. Expression of creativity also supports quality of life. Creativity includes personal creativity, in which a person presents new ideas authentically, but it can also be expanded to social creativity, in which a community or society produces and recognizes ideas collectively. Creativity is applied in typical human life to solve problems as they occur. It also leads humans to carry out art and science. Individuals engaging in advanced creative work typically have specialized knowledge in that field, and humans draw on this knowledge to develop novel ideas. In art, creativity is used to develop new artistic works, such as visual art or music. In science, those with knowledge in a particular scientific field can use trial and error to develop theories that more accurately explain phenomena.

Religious behavior is a set of traditions that are followed based on the teachings of a religious belief system. The nature of religious behavior varies depending on the specific religious traditions. Most religious traditions involve variations of telling myths, practicing rituals, making certain things taboo, adopting symbolism, determining morality, experiencing altered states of consciousness, and believing in supernatural beings. Religious behavior is often demanding and has high time, energy, and material costs, and it conflicts with rational choice models of human behavior, though it does provide community-related benefits. Anthropologists offer competing theories as to why humans adopted religious behavior. Religious behavior is heavily influenced by social factors, and group involvement is significant in the development of an individual's religious behavior. Social structures such as religious organizations or family units allow the sharing and coordination of religious behavior. These social connections reinforce the cognitive behaviors associated with religion, encouraging orthodoxy and commitment. According to a Pew Research Center report, 54% of adults around the world state that religion is very important in their lives as of 2018.

Physiological behavior 

Humans undergo many behaviors common to animals to support the processes of the human body. Humans eat food to obtain nutrition. These foods may be chosen for their nutritional value, but they may also be eaten for pleasure. Eating often follows a food preparation process to make it more enjoyable. Humans dispose of excess food through waste. Excrement is often treated as taboo, particularly in developed and urban communities where sanitation is more widely available and excrement has no value as fertilizer. Humans also regularly engage in sleep, based on homeostatic and circadian factors. The circadian rhythm causes humans to require sleep at a regular pattern and is typically calibrated to the day-night cycle and sleep-wake habits. Homeostasis is also be maintained, causing longer sleep longer after periods of sleep deprivation. The human sleep cycle takes place over 90 minutes, and it repeats 3-5 times during normal sleep.

There are also unique behaviors that humans undergo to maintain physical health. Humans have developed medicine to prevent and treat illnesses. In industrialized nations, eating habits that favor better nutrition, hygienic behaviors that promote sanitation, medical treatment to eradicate diseases, and the use of birth control significantly improve human health. Humans can also engage in exercise beyond that required for survival to maintain health. Humans engage in hygiene to limit exposure to dirt and pathogens. Some of these behaviors are adaptive while others are learned. Basic behaviors of disgust evolved as an adaptation to prevent contact with sources of pathogens, resulting in a biological aversion to feces, body fluids, rotten food, and animals that are commonly disease vectors. Personal grooming, disposal of human corpses, use of sewerage, and use of cleaning agents are hygienic behaviors common to most human societies.

Humans reproduce sexually, engaging in sexual intercourse for both reproduction and sexual pleasure. Human reproduction is closely associated with human sexuality and an instinctive desire to procreate, though humans are unique in that they intentionally control the number of offspring that they produce. Humans engage in a large variety of reproductive behaviors relative to other animals, with various mating structures that include forms of monogamy, polygyny, and polyandry. How humans engage in mating behavior is heavily influenced by cultural norms and customs. Unlike most mammals, human women ovulate spontaneously rather than seasonally, with a menstrual cycle that typically lasts 25-35 days.

Humans are bipedal and move by walking. Human walking corresponds to the bipedal gait cycle, which involves alternating heel contact and toe off with the ground and slight elevation and rotation of the pelvis. Balance while walking learned during the first 7–9 years of life, and individual humans develop unique gaits while learning to displace weight, adjust center of mass, and correspond neural control with movement. Humans can achieve higher speed by running. The endurance running hypothesis proposes that humans can outpace most other animals over long distances through running, though human running causes a higher rate of energy exertion. The human body self-regulates through perspiration during periods of exertion, allowing humans more endurance than other animals. The human hand is prehensile and capable of grasping objects and applying force with control over the hand's dexterity and grip strength. This allows the use of complex tools by humans.

Economic behavior 

Humans engage in predictable behaviors when considering economic decisions, and these behaviors may or may not be rational. Like all animals, humans make basic decisions through cost–benefit analysis and the risk–return spectrum, though humans are able to contemplate these decisions more thoroughly. Human economic decision making is often reference dependent, in which options are weighed in reference to the status quo rather than absolute gains and losses. Humans are also loss averse, fearing loss rather than seeking gain. Advanced economic behavior developed in humans after the Neolithic Revolution and the development of agriculture. These developments led to a sustainable supply of resources that allowed specialization in more complex societies.

Work 

The nature of human work is defined by the complexity of society. The simplest societies are tribes that work primarily for sustenance as hunter-gatherers. In this sense, work is not a distinct activity but a constant that makes up all parts of life, as all members of the society must work consistently to stay alive. More advanced societies developed after the Neolithic Revolution, emphasizing work in agricultural and pastoral settings. In these societies, production is increased, ending the need for constant work and allowing some individuals to specialize and work in areas outside of food-production. This also created non-laborious work, as increasing occupational complexity required some individuals to specialize in technical knowledge and administration. Laborious work in these societies has variously been carried out by slaves, serfs, peasants, and guild craftsmen. The nature of work changed significantly during the Industrial Revolution in which the factory system was developed for use by industrializing nations. In addition to further increasing general quality of life, this development changed the dynamic of work. Under the factory system, workers increasingly collaborate with others, employers serve as authority figures during work hours, and forced labor is largely eradicated. Further changes occur in post-industrial societies where technological advance makes industries obsolete, replacing them with mass production and service industries.

Humans approach work differently based on both physical and personal attributes, and some work with more effectiveness and commitment than others. Some find work to contribute to personal fulfillment, while others work only out of necessity. Work can also serve as an identity, with individuals identifying themselves based on their occupation. Work motivation is complex, both contributing to and subtracting from various human needs. The primary motivation for work is for material gain, which takes the form of money in modern societies. It may also serve to create self-esteem and personal worth, provide activity, gain respect, and express creativity. Modern work is typically categorized as laborious or blue-collar work and non-laborious or white-collar work.

Leisure 

Leisure is activity or lack of activity that takes place outside of work. It provides relaxation, entertainment, and improved quality of life for individuals. Casual leisure behaviors provide short-term gratification, but they do not provide long-term gratification or personal identity. These include play, relaxation, casual social interaction, volunteering, passive entertainment, active entertainment, and sensory stimulation. Passive entertainment is typically derived from mass media, which may include written works or digital media. Active entertainment involves games in which individuals participate. Sensory stimulation is immediate gratification from behaviors such as eating or sex. Serious leisure behaviors involve non-professional pursuit of arts and sciences, the development of hobbies, or career volunteering in an area of expertise. Leisure can be beneficial for physical and mental health. It may be used to seek temporary relief from psychological stress, to produce positive emotions, or to facilitate social interaction. Leisure can also facilitate health risks and negative emotions caused by boredom, substance abuse, or high-risk behavior.

Consumption 

Humans operate as consumers that obtain and use goods. All production is ultimately designed for consumption, and consumers adapt their behavior based on the availability of production. Mass consumption began during the Industrial Revolution, caused by the development of new technologies that allowed for increased production. Many factors affect a consumer's decision to purchase goods through trade. They may consider the nature of the product, its associated cost, the convenience of purchase, and the nature of advertising around the product. Cultural factors may influence this decision, as different cultures value different things, and subcultures within these cultures may have distinct priorities as buyers. Social class, including wealth, education, and occupation may affect one's purchasing behavior. A consumer's interpersonal relationships and reference groups may also influence purchasing behavior.

Ecological behavior 

Like all living things, humans live in ecosystems and interact with other organisms. Human behavior is affected by the environment in which a human lives, and environments are affected by human habitation. Humans have also developed man-made ecosystems such as urban areas and agricultural land. Geography and landscape ecology determine how humans are distributed within an ecosystem, both naturally and through planned urban morphology.

Humans exercise control over the animals that live within their environment. Domesticated animals are trained and cared for by humans. Humans can develop social and emotional bonds with animals in their care. Pets are kept for companionship within human homes, including dogs and cats that have been bred for domestication over many centuries. Livestock animals, such as cattle, sheep, goats, and poultry, are kept on agricultural land to produce animal products. Domesticated animals are also kept in laboratories for animal testing. Non-domesticated animals are sometimes kept in nature reserves and zoos for tourism and conservation.

Factors
Human behavior is influenced by biological and cultural elements. The structure and agency debate considers whether human behavior is predominantly led by individual human impulses or by external structural forces. Behavioral genetics considers how human behavior is affected by inherited traits. Though genes do not guarantee certain behaviors, certain traits can be inherited that make individuals more likely to engage in certain behaviors or express certain personalities. An individual's environment can also affect behavior, often in conjunction with genetic factors. An individual's personality and attitudes affect how behaviors are expressed, formed in conjunction by genetic and environmental factors.

Age 

While specific traits of one's personality, temperament, and genetics may be more consistent, other behaviors change as one moves between life stages—i.e., from birth through adolescence, adulthood, and, for example, parenthood and retirement.

Infants are limited in their ability to interpret their surroundings shortly after birth. Object permanence and understanding of motion typically develop within the first six months of an infant's life, though the specific cognitive processes are not understood. The ability to mentally categorize different concepts and objects that they perceive also develops within the first year. Infants are quickly able to discern their body from their surroundings and often take interest in their own limbs or actions they cause by two months of age. Infants practice imitation of other individuals to engage socially and learn new behaviors. In young infants, this involves imitating facial expressions, and imitation of tool use takes place within the first year. Communication develops over the first year, and infants begin using gestures to communicate intention around nine to ten months of age. Verbal communication develops more gradually, taking form during the second year of age.

Children develop fine motor skills shortly after infancy, in the range of three to six years of age, allowing them to engage in behaviors using the hands and eye–hand coordination and perform basic activities of self sufficiency. Children begin expressing more complex emotions in the three to six year old range, including humor, empathy, and altruism, as well engaging in creativity and inquiry. Aggressive behaviors also become varied at this age as children engage in increased physical aggression before learning to favor diplomacy over aggression. Children at this age can express themselves using language with basic grammar. As children grow older, they develop emotional intelligence. Young children engage in basic social behaviors with peers, typically forming friendships centered on play with individuals of the same age and gender. Behaviors of young children are centered around play, which allows them to practice physical, cognitive, and social behaviors. Basic self-concept first develops as children grow, particularly centered around traits such as gender and ethnicity, and behavior is heavily affected by peers for the first time.

Adolescents undergo changes in behavior caused by puberty and the associated changes in hormone production. Production of testosterone increases sensation seeking and sensitivity to rewards in adolescents as well as aggression and risk-taking in adolescent boys. Production of estradiol causes similar risk-taking behavior among adolescent girls. The new hormones cause changes in emotional processing that allow for close friendships, stronger motivations and intentions, and adolescent sexuality. Adolescents undergo social changes on a large scale, developing a full self-concept and making autonomous decisions independently of adults. They typically become more aware of social norms and social cues than children, causing an increase in self-consciousness and adolescent egocentrism that guides behavior in social settings throughout adolescence.

Disability 
Physical disabilities can prevent individuals from engaging in typical human behavior or necessitate alternative behaviors. Accommodations and accessibility are often made available for individuals with physical disabilities in developed nations, including health care, assistive technology, and vocational services. Severe disabilities are associated with increased leisure time but also with a lower satisfaction in the quality of leisure time. Productivity and health both commonly undergo long term decline following the onset of a severe disability. Mental disabilities are those that directly affect cognitive and social behavior. Common mental disorders include mood disorders, anxiety disorders, personality disorders, and substance dependence.

See also

 Behavioral modernity
 Behaviorism
 Cultural ecology
 Human behavioral ecology
 Motivation

References

Bibliography

Further reading 
Ardrey, Robert. 1970. The Social Contract: A Personal Inquiry into the Evolutionary Sources of Order and Disorder. Atheneum. .

External links
 
 

 
Humans
Behavior
Main topic articles